Events in the year 2020 in Equatorial Guinea.

Incumbents
 President: Teodoro Obiang Nguema Mbasogo 
 Prime Minister: Francisco Pascual Obama Asue

Events

14 March – First confirmed case of COVID-19 in Equatorial Guinea

Sport

11 January – start of the 2019–20 Equatoguinean Primera División

Deaths

6 February – André Neles, footballer (b. 1978).
8 April – Miguel Jones, Equatoguinean-born Spanish footballer (b. 1938).
8 July – Santiago Nchama, politician (born c. 1950).

See also
COVID-19 pandemic in Equatorial Guinea

References

 
2020s in Equatorial Guinea 
Years of the 21st century in Equatorial Guinea 
Equatorial Guinea 
Equatorial Guinea